Richard Vernon (1925–1997) was a British actor.

Richard Vernon may also refer to:

Richard Vernon (academic) (born 1945), Canadian academic 
Richard Vernon (bass) (1953–2006), American opera singer
Richard Vernon (character), the high school principal played by Paul Gleason in the 1985 film The Breakfast Club
Richard Vernon (musician) (born 1962), British musician
Richard Vernon (speaker) (c. 1389–1451), English politician and speaker of the House of Commons
Sir Richard Vernon, 3rd Baronet (1678–1725), English diplomat
Richard Vernon (MP) (1726–1800), British horse breeder, trainer and politician
Dick Vernon (1878–1954), Australian rules footballer
Richard Vernon (born 1989), Educator and Company Director